Alan Daley (11 October 1927 – 2008) is an English former footballer who played in the Football League for Hull City, Doncaster Rovers, Scunthorpe United, Mansfield Town, Stockport County, Crewe Alexandra and Coventry City.

External links
 

English footballers
English Football League players
1927 births
2008 deaths
Mansfield Town F.C. players
Hull City A.F.C. players
Bangor City F.C. players
Worksop Town F.C. players
Doncaster Rovers F.C. players
Peterborough United F.C. players
Boston United F.C. players
Scunthorpe United F.C. players
Corby Town F.C. players
Stockport County F.C. players
Crewe Alexandra F.C. players
Coventry City F.C. players
Cambridge United F.C. players
Association football forwards